On the Winning Side, is an album by American contemporary gospel music group Commissioned, released in 1987 on Light Records.

Domestically, the album peaked at number 6 on the US Billboard Top Gospel albums chart and number 24 on the Billboard Top Contemporary Christian chart.

Track listing
 "You Keep on Blessing Me" – 4:14
 "Strange Land" – 4:16
 "I'm Gonna Let My Love Flow" – 4:00
 "You Can Depend on Jesus" – 3:54
 "Only What You Do for Jesus Christ Will Last" – 4:44
 "What Will You Say?" – 4:56
 "When Jesus Sings" – 5:04
 "Perilous Times" – 3:59
 "Jesus Cares" – 4:03

Personnel
Fred Hammond: bocals, bass, drum programming
Keith Staten: vocals
Mitchell Jones: vocals
Karl Reid: vocals
Michael Brooks: keyboards, Synclavier
Michael Williams: drums, percussion

Additional Musicians
Earl J. Wright: percussion, synthesizer
Michael Wright: guitar
Eric Brice: guitar

References

Commissioned (gospel group) albums
1987 albums